Jack Burdett Shuck III (born June 18, 1987) is an American former professional baseball outfielder. He previously played in Major League Baseball (MLB) for the Houston Astros, Los Angeles Angels, Cleveland Indians, Chicago White Sox, Miami Marlins, and Pittsburgh Pirates.

Amateur career
Born in Westerville, Ohio and raised in Galion, Shuck went to Galion High School. At Galion High, he batted .576 with a 1.650 OPS and had a 1.12 ERA with 134 strikeouts in 69 innings, and also lettered in basketball. Shuck went to Ohio State University where in 2006, as a freshman, he batted .325 in 123 AB as a hitter, and led the team in ERA as a pitcher. He was named the Big Ten Conference Freshman of the Year. In 2007, he hit .382 and had a 4.89 ERA. After the 2007 season, he played collegiate summer baseball with the Cotuit Kettleers of the Cape Cod Baseball League. In 2008, he hit .356 and had a 4.29 ERA and led the team in strikeouts. Shuck was drafted in the sixth round, 182nd overall, by the Houston Astros as an outfielder in the 2008 MLB Draft.

Professional career

Minor leagues
Shuck played 2008 with Short-Season Tri-City, where he hit .300 and was a New York–Penn League All-Star. He played with High-A Lancaster in 2009, where he hit .315 with 18 SB and 36 RBI. He started 2010 with Double-A Corpus Christi, where he was a Texas League All-Star, hitting .298 with 28 RBI in 101 games before earning a promotion to Triple-A Round Rock. After the Astros and the Texas Rangers switched affiliates, Shuck started 2011 with Oklahoma City, where he was a Pacific Coast League All-Star, with a .401 OBP in 101 games before earning a promotion.

Houston Astros
On August 5, 2011, Shuck was called up to the majors to replace Luis Durango, who was designated for assignment. In his first major league at bat, he hit a single off Milwaukee Brewers' Yovani Gallardo and stole second.

Shuck spent all of 2012 with Oklahoma City, hitting .298/.374/.352 in 115 games with 33 RBI. On November 3, Shuck elected to become a free agent after refusing outright minor league assignment.

Los Angeles Angels of Anaheim
Shuck signed a minor league contract with the Los Angeles Angels of Anaheim as a free agent in November 2012 with an invitation to spring training.

On July 29, 2013, Shuck hit his first career home run against the Texas Rangers. He appeared in 22 games for the Angels in 2014 and hit .167, but he had spent most of the season with the team's Class AAA minor league affiliate, where he hit .320.

Cleveland Indians
On September 5, 2014, Shuck was traded to the Cleveland Indians for cash considerations.

Chicago White Sox
On November 3, 2014, Shuck was claimed off waivers by Chicago White Sox.

On June 8, 2016, Shuck pitched for the White Sox against the Washington Nationals in the top of the 9th inning in an 11–0 game. He allowed one hit, one run, did not walk or strike out anyone, but he got Bryce Harper to ground out. He was outrighted on November 2, 2016.

Minnesota Twins
On December 17, 2016, Shuck signed a minor league deal with the Twins. He elected free agency on November 6, 2017.

Miami Marlins
On November 24, 2017, Shuck signed a minor league contract with the Miami Marlins. He had his contract purchased on April 13, 2018. He was designated for assignment on July 5. He hit .192 with 4 RBI's. He declared free agency on October 2, 2018.

Pittsburgh Pirates
Shuck signed a minor league deal with the Pittsburgh Pirates on January 30, 2019. On March 28, it was announced Shuck had made the Opening Day roster. Shuck was designated for assignment on May 4, 2019 and outrighted on May 8. On May 18, it was announced that Shuck would attempt to become a two-way player, splitting his time between pitcher and outfielder. He elected free agency on October 1.

Washington Nationals
On February 12, 2020, Shuck signed a minor league deal with the Washington Nationals. He was released on May 30th.

Personal life
Shuck is the only son of Jack II and Cindy Sheffer. He has one sister, Amanda.

On November 9, 2013, Shuck married Christine Anne Cimino at the University of Notre Dame, making him the second professional baseball player to marry into the Cimino family: Christine's sister, Mary Catherine Cimino, is married to pitcher Mark Melancon.

References

External links
 
Ohio State Buckeyes Player Bio

1987 births
Living people
People from Galion, Ohio
Baseball players from Ohio
Major League Baseball outfielders
Houston Astros players
Los Angeles Angels players
Cleveland Indians players
Chicago White Sox players
Miami Marlins players
Pittsburgh Pirates players
Ohio State Buckeyes baseball players
Tri-City ValleyCats players
Lancaster JetHawks players
Corpus Christi Hooks players
Round Rock Express players
Oklahoma City RedHawks players
Salt Lake Bees players
Peoria Javelinas players
Charlotte Knights players
Rochester Red Wings players
New Orleans Baby Cakes players
Indianapolis Indians players
Cotuit Kettleers players